Atlantic Coast Line 4-4-2 were express passenger tender locomotives built by Baldwin Locomotive Works (at that time known as Burnham, Williams & Co), initially for the Atlantic Coast Line Railroad as classes I/I-2 and I-3.  They were the first design in the world to exploit the larger boiler and firebox possible with a  design compared to the classic .

Design and build
The advantages of the  design included a large boiler and a firebox of "desirable form" with "ample depth and width" which could be fitted over the rear frames, and this design for the first to exploit those features. There were also claimed of improved riding compared to some other types.

The initial batch of five were constructed in 1894/5.  Further members classified as Class I/I-2 were built and the final two classified class I-3 were constructed in 1900.

History
The class was introduced to the constituent companies operating the ACL brand from 1894-1895.

Legacy
The adoption of the name Atlantic for the class and subsequently the  wheelbase arrangement itself derives from name of the railroad they were supplied to. The advantages of the "Atlantic" type led to several other designs around the start of the twentieth century adopting the  wheelbase for express passenger work including the Milwaukee Road class A2, Pennsylvania Railroad class E1, as well as several railroads abroad for example the Lancashire and Yorkshire Railway Class 7 in the United Kingdom.

References

Footnotes

Sources
 
 

4-4-2 locomotives
Railway locomotives introduced in 1895
Baldwin locomotives
Atlantic Coast Line Railroad
Steam locomotives of the United States